Jamie Loeb and An-Sophie Mestach were the defending champions, but Loeb chose to participate in Sacramento instead. Mestach partnered Cristiana Ferrando, but they withdrew before their quarterfinal match.

Ellen Perez and Carol Zhao won the title, defeating Alexa Guarachi and Olivia Tjandramulia in the final, 6–2, 6–2.

Seeds

Draw

References
Main Draw

Challenger Banque Nationale de Granby
Challenger de Granby